Andy Dennehy is the former starting quarterback for the Dublin Rebels in the Irish American Football League. Dennehy was the MVP in Shamrock Bowl XIX in 2005 when he led his side to a 26-19 victory over the Belfast Bulls. 

Dennehy recently became the most successful player in Irish American Football League history, winning his 9th Shamrock Bowl at Shamrock Bowl XXXI on 13 August 2017.

Notes

Year of birth missing (living people)
Living people
American football quarterbacks
Irish players of American football